Jamarius "J'Mar" Smith (born September 24, 1996) is an American football quarterback for the Birmingham Stallions of the United States Football League (USFL). He played college football at Louisiana Tech University.

Early years
A multi-sport athlete, Smith was a three-star recruit out of Meridian High School in Meridian, Mississippi. At Meridian, he was teammates with Miami Dolphins defensive tackle Raekwon Davis and Indianapolis Colts cornerback Travis Reed. He accepted a full-scholarship from Louisiana Tech over offers from Mississippi State and Memphis. He was recruited to Louisiana Tech by former NFL quarterback Tim Rattay.

Smith played as a catcher for the Meridian baseball team. He was drafted by the San Diego Padres of Major League Baseball (MLB) in the 24th round of the 2015 MLB Draft, but he declined to sign a professional contract with the team.

College career
As a redshirt senior, Smith started 11 games and was 236-of-367 passing for 2,977 yards and 18 touchdowns on the season. During his redshirt senior season, Smith was suspended for two games for violating athletic department policy. Smith led his team to a 14–0 win over Miami in the 2019 Walk On's Independence Bowl and was named Conference USA's 2019 Football Offensive Player of the Year.

College statistics

Professional career

New England Patriots 
On May 5, 2020, Smith signed as an undrafted free agent with the New England Patriots. On July 26, 2020, he was waived before the start of training camp.

Smith had a tryout with the Green Bay Packers on August 23, 2020.

Hamilton Tiger-Cats
He signed with the Hamilton Tiger-Cats of the CFL on May 17, 2021. He was assigned to the practice roster as the 4th string quarterback. He was released on August 21, 2021.

Birmingham Stallions 
Smith was selected in the 12th round of the 2022 USFL Draft by the Birmingham Stallions, reuniting with his college head coach Skip Holtz. After leading the Stallions to a victory over the New Jersey Generals in the USFL Kickoff game, Smith was voted USFL Week 1 offensive player of the week. On July 3, Smith won the USFL championship game.

Career Statistics

Personal
J'Mar Smith is the son of former NFL defensive lineman Kenny Smith, who played with the New Orleans Saints and Kansas City Chiefs. During his first season with the Birmingham Stallions, Smith was awarded Birmingham Stallions Best Hair Award by his teammates as a joke.

References

External links
Louisiana Tech Bulldogs bio

1996 births
Living people
Sportspeople from Meridian, Mississippi
Players of American football from Mississippi
American football quarterbacks
Louisiana Tech Bulldogs football players
New England Patriots players
Hamilton Tiger-Cats players
Birmingham Stallions (2022) players